The Shere SMART ("SMART Terminal") is a desktop-based railway ticket issuing system, developed by the Guildford-based company Shere Ltd, utilising Newbury Data ND4020 ticket printer, first introduced in Britain in 2003.  Since the first trial installation of the system in the ticket office at London Bridge station, approximately 300 terminals have been installed at stations on the Southern and former Thameslink networks.

Origins
After the railway network was privatised in the mid-1990s, it was decided that when the existing "Heritage" ticket issuing systems (APTIS, SPORTIS and the Quickfare passenger-operated machines) needed replacing, the contracts should be put out to competitive tender. Although the Rail Settlement Plan (RSP) scheme, overseen and controlled by the newly created Association of Train Operating Companies (ATOC), would set various requirements and regulate the introduction of such systems through an official accreditation process, any company which wished to set up a ticket issuing system and offer it for accreditation could do so.  Once it had been accredited, the system could then be offered to the individual Train Operating Companies once they were ready to replace their existing equipment.

Accordingly, having met RSP's requirements, the SMART Terminal began to be installed on a trial basis in 2003.  London Bridge was the first station to gain one, in January of that year, when Connex South Eastern elected to put the system on trial.  Over the next 18 months, more machines were trialled at various locations by other TOCs as part of the tendering process.  (Train Operating Company names shown in the table are those current at the time of installation.)

There was also a machine (number 5029) in an Excess Fares office at London Paddington, from August 2004 until June 2006. First Great Western have replaced this with a Fujitsu STAR terminal.

Installation programme
The Southern and Thameslink TOCs, both at that time owned and operated by the Govia company, signed contracts in 2004 to have SMART installed in ticket offices at their stations.  Southern began by putting in two terminals each at Balham and Norwood Junction (the latter in conjunction with a major station refurbishment project) during the summer; once these had "bedded in" successfully, the roll-out continued across the rest of the network, with a number of small stations waiting until April 2005 for their APTIS machines to be replaced.  Delayed installations occurred at Woodmansterne (September 2005) and Littlehaven (December 2005).  The smaller Thameslink network had all of its stations equipped with SMART Terminals between September and December 2004.

Features
 SMART can be operated using a standard keyboard and mouse interface, or by using the terminals' touch-screen capability.
 A programmable list of the 24 most popular tickets from the "home" station is displayed on the screen by default.  These can be changed locally or centrally according to temporary requirements - for example, Off-peak Day Returns to Twickenham could be added just before a major rugby game at the stadium there.
 All tickets available for a given journey are listed on the screen in price order, allowing the ticket clerk to discuss ticket options with the passenger more easily.
 Full integration with the database of season ticket holders; this allows renewals to be done much more quickly, removes the need to update the database manually, and ensures that discounts for failure to meet service level targets are automatically applied.
 Integration with the RJIS (Rail Journey Information System), a central database of station names, routes etc.; CRS (Central Reservation System, for booking seats); and LENNON (an accounting system which gives TOCs next-day reporting of sales and settlement of revenue owing).
 Use of "Common Stock" blank ticket stock (code RSP 9599) - see below.

Common Stock ticketing
Whereas the APTIS system used different blank cards for almost every type of ticket, SMART prints almost all tickets on the same, orange-banded stock with no pre-printed headings (batch reference RSP 9599).  The main examples are shown here:

External links
List of known Shere SMART positions as of 2006, with dates of installation
Article in Rail Professional, March 2006 - Note that the sentence "Chiltern Railways, another Shere customer, opted for SMART" should read "...opted for FAST"

Fare collection systems in the United Kingdom
Public transport information systems
Science and technology in Surrey
Travel technology